7-Chloro-L-tryptophan oxidase (RebO) is an enzyme with systematic name 7-chloro-L-tryptophan:oxygen oxidoreductase. This enzyme catalyses the following chemical reaction

 7-chloro-L-tryptophan + O2  2-imino-3-(7-chloroindol-3-yl)propanoate + H2O2

This enzyme contains a noncovalently bound FAD.

References

External links 
 

EC 1.4.3